Huigobio is a genus of cyprinid fish that is found in Eastern Asia.

Species
These are the currently recognized species in this genus:
 Huigobio chenhsienensis P. W. Fang, 1938, 1938
 Huigobio exilicauda  Jiang & Zhang, 2013
 Huigobio heterocheilus Zhi-Xian Sun, Xue-Jian Li, Wen-Qiao Tang, Ya-Hui Zhao, 2022

References

 
Cyprinid fish of Asia